Alexander Norman "Derry" Jeffares AM (/ˈdʒɛfəz/, 11 August 1920 – 1 June 2005) was an Irish literary scholar.

Early life and education

Jeffares was born in Dublin, educated at Dublin High School, Trinity College Dublin (where he was elected a Scholar in classics in 1941), and Oriel College, Oxford.

Academic career
Jeffares took up his first academic appointment at the Department of English at the University of Groningen in 1947 and then moved to the University of Edinburgh in 1948. In 1951, at the very early age of 30, he was appointed to the Jury Chair of English at the University of Adelaide where he stayed until taking up the Chair of English at the University of Leeds in 1957. Finally, he moved to the University of Stirling in 1974. While at Leeds, he was a founder of The Journal of Commonwealth Literature.  

He retired as Emeritus Professor of English in 1985.

Honours
In 1978 he was made an honorary fellow of Trinity College Dublin. On Australia Day 1988, Jeffares was appointed an Honorary Member of the Order of Australia, "for service to the study of Australian literature overseas".

In 2013, an edition of the Yeats Annual was dedicated to him.

References

External links
timesonline.co.uk

1920 births
2005 deaths
People from Dublin (city)
People educated at The High School, Dublin
Alumni of Trinity College Dublin
Scholars of Trinity College Dublin
Alumni of Oriel College, Oxford
Academic staff of the University of Groningen
Academics of the University of Edinburgh
Academic staff of the University of Adelaide
Academics of the University of Leeds
Academics of the University of Stirling
Fellows of the Australian Academy of the Humanities
Honorary Fellows of Trinity College Dublin
Honorary Members of the Order of Australia
Literary scholars
W. B. Yeats scholars